WJRI (1340 AM) is a radio station broadcasting an adult contemporary format. Licensed to Lenoir, North Carolina, United States, the station is currently owned by Foothills Radio Group.

On May 29, 2017, WJRI changed their format from news/talk to an oldies format branded as "Just Right Radio."

In 2020, WJRI changed their format from oldies to adult contemporary branded as "Star 94.7 & 100.5."

Previous logo

External links

JRI